Idrissa Camara (born 18 June 1998) is a Senegalese professional footballer who plays as a winger for Dijon.

Career
Camara is a product of the youth academy of the Senegalese club Dakar Sacré-Cœur since the age of 11. He began his senior career in the TFF First League with Ümraniyespor on 6 October 2020. In the 2021-22 season, he scored 7 times as the club came in second the TFF First League and achieved promotion to the Süper Lig. He transferred to the French Ligue 2 squad Dijon in the summer of 2022.

Personal life
Camara was born in Senegal and is of Malian descent. His brothers Papa Bamory and Mamadou are also professional footballers.

References

External links
 
 

1998 births
Living people
Footballers from Dakar
Senegalese footballers
Senegalese people of Malian descent
Association football wingers
Ligue 2 players
TFF First League players
Senegal Premier League players
Dijon FCO players
Ümraniyespor footballers
Senegalese expatriate footballers
Senegalese expatriates in France
Senegalese expatriate sportspeople in Turkey
Expatriate footballers in France
Expatriate footballers in Turkey